The Salt Creek Canyon massacre occurred on June 4, 1858, when four Danish immigrants were ambushed and killed by unidentified Indians in Salt Creek Canyon, a winding canyon of Salt Creek east of present-day Nephi, in Juab County, Utah.

Massacre
In early June 1858, Danish immigrants Jens Jorgensen, his pregnant wife Hedevig Marie Jensen Jorgensen, Jens Terklesen, Christian I. Kjerluf, and John Ericksen were journeying, unarmed, to settle with other Scandinavian immigrants at the Mormon colony in the Sanpete Valley. The group was traveling with an ox team hitched to a wagon and another ox hitched to a handcart.

On the afternoon of June 4, they had come within a mile and a half of Salt Creek Canyon's opening into the Sanpete Valley when members of an unidentified Indian tribe emerged from hiding places and attacked them. Two of the men were killed and burned with their wagon. The pregnant woman was killed near the wagon with a tomahawk, which received special note from historians. Ericksen, who had been walking some distance ahead of the others, escaped unharmed and made it to the nearby town of Ephraim around dark. The ox attached to the handcart, frightened by the attack, fled back to Nephi. The victims' bodies were brought to Ephraim for burial. The motive for the attack remains unclear.

Monument

A Daughters of Utah Pioneers monument (number 11), erected in 1936 on Utah State Route 132 between Nephi and Fountain Green, Utah, marks the site of the massacre.

See also
 Fountain Green massacre
 Mountain Meadows Massacre
 Utah War
 Mormon pioneers
 Latter Day Saint martyrs

Notes

References

External links

Canyons and gorges of Utah
Danish-American history
Juab County, Utah
Mormonism and Native Americans
Massacres by Native Americans
-Salt Creek Canyon Massacre
Sanpete County, Utah
Utah Territory
Utah War
1858 in Utah Territory
June 1858 events
Conflicts in 1858